Hrvoje Ledić was a handball player. He was born in Baku, Azerbaijan on 4 March 1955. He died on 8 May 2010 in a car crash. In his life he was named as one of the best players at Izviđač Banja Luka and RK Borac Travnik.
HK Baku (1968-1972) 80 matches 5 goals,
RK Borac Travnik (1972-1978)159 matches 123 goals,
RK Izviđač Banja Luka (1978-1986) 247 matches 201 goal,
HK Baku (1986-1987) 20 matches 11 goals,
USSR U-21 (1975-1976) 10 matches 12 goals,
USSR (1976-1987) 8 matches 1 goal

Team Glory: winner of the 4th USSR Handball League (1970), 3rd Yugoslavian League (1975), 2nd Yugoslavian League (1981).

Player: Top Scorer of the 3rd Yugoslavian League (1975), 2nd Yugoslavian League (1981), Most Assists, 1st Yugoslavian League (1984).

Azerbaijani male handball players
1955 births
2010 deaths